This is an incomplete list of works by George Vincent. The British artist George Vincent (June 17961832). was one of the most talented of the Norwich School of painters; his work was founded on the Dutch School of landscape painting as well as the style of John Crome. The school's reputation outside East Anglia in the 1820s was based largely upon the works of him and his friend James Stark.

Vincent was educated at Norwich Grammar School and afterwards apprenticed to Crome. He exhibited in London and elsewhere, and from 1811 until 1831 showed works with the Norwich Society of Artists, exhibiting more than a 100 pictures of Norfolk landscapes and marine works. By 1818 he had relocated to London and had obtained the patronage of wealthy clients, but then began to struggle financially. His financial problems led to his incarceration in the Fleet Prison for debt in 1824.

After 1831, Vincent disappeared and his whereabouts after this date remain uncertain. His death may have occurred before April 1832, perhaps in Bath. His picture Greenwich Hospital from the River was shown in London three decades after his death and caused renewed interest in his paintings and helped to establish his reputation as a leading member of the Norwich School. The art historian Herbert Minton Cundall wrote in the 1920s that had Vincent "not given way to intemperate habits he would probably have ranked amongst the foremost of British landscape painters".

Etchings
Key
 BM—work held at the British Museum in London
 NMC—work held by the Norfolk Museums Collections, based at Norwich Castle
 O—work held elsewhere.

Oil paintings

Other works

Attributed works

Footnotes

References

  

 

 

  

British paintings
Lists of works of art by the Norwich School of painters
Lists of paintings